Canjura is a surname. Notable people with the surname include:

Héctor Canjura (born 1976), Salvadoran footballer
Noe Canjura (1922–1970), Salvadoran painter